Third-seeded Alice Marble defeated first-seeded Helen Jacobs 4–6, 6–3, 6–2 in the final to win the women's singles tennis title at the 1936 U.S. National Championships. The tournament was played on outdoor grass courts and held from September 3, through September 12, 1936 at the West Side Tennis Club in Forest Hills, Queens, New York.

The draw consisted of 64 players of which eight were seeded.

Seeds
The eight seeded U.S. players are listed below. Alice Marble is the champion; others show in brackets the round in which they were eliminated.

  Helen Jacobs (finalist)
  Sarah Fabyan (first round)
  Alice Marble (champion)
  Carolin Babcock (quarterfinals)
  Marjorie Van Ryn (third round)
  Gracyn Wheeler (quarterfinals)
  Helen Pedersen (semifinals)
  Mary Greef Harris (third round)

Draw

Final eight

References

1936
1936 in women's tennis
1936 in American women's sports
Women's Singles
Forest Hills, Queens
Women's sports in New York (state)
Women in New York City
1936 in sports in New York (state)